Saint-Paul is a municipality in the Lanaudière region of Quebec, Canada, part of the Joliette Regional County Municipality.

History

Saint-Paul was born in the northeast of the former Lordship of Lavaltrie. The first settlers, mainly from Saint-Pierre-du-Portage (L’Assomption) and Saint-Sulpice, cleared the territory gradually. First along the L’Assomption River around 1748, then on the coast of the Ouareau River around 1750 and on the Saint-Pierre stream around 1765. The population grew rapidly. Then, the territory was known as Saint-Paul-de-Lavaltrie

In 1855, the Parliament of United Canada passed the Lower Canada Municipalities and Roads Act to ensure the legal existence of many localities. That year, on July 1, a municipality was officially born under the name Conversion-de-Saint-Paul. In April 1922, the more urban sector of Conversion-de-Saint-Paul splitted away to form the new village municipality of Saint-Paul. That village changed its name seven years later to become the current village of Saint-Pierre. Meanwhile the rural Conversion-de-Saint-Paul would eventually change its name to only Saint-Paul, in 1954, to become the municipality we currently know.

Demographics
Population trend:
 Population in 2021: 6566 (2016 to 2021 population change: 11.5%)
 Population in 2016: 5891 
 Population in 2011: 5122 
 Population in 2006: 3987
 Population in 2001: 3616 (or 3606 with 2006 boundaries)
 Population in 1996: 3644
 Population in 1991: 3648

Private dwellings occupied by usual residents: 2701 (total dwellings: 2755)

Mother tongue:
 English as first language: 0.8%
 French as first language: 95.8%
 English and French as first language: 0.8%
 Other as first language: 1.9%

Education

Commission scolaire des Samares operates francophone public schools, including:
 École La Passerelle
 pavillon Notre-Dame-du-Sacré-Coeur
 pavillon Vert-Demain

The Sir Wilfrid Laurier School Board operates anglophone public schools, including:
 Joliette Elementary School in Saint-Charles-Borromée
 Joliette High School in Joliette

The sole private school is operated by a cult, Mission de l'Esprit-Saint. It opened in 2016, following the foreclosure of the former illegal school, a decade ago :
 École l'Accord

See also
List of municipalities in Quebec

References

External links

Incorporated places in Lanaudière
Municipalities in Quebec